Harry Gabriel Hamlet (27 August 1874 – 24 January 1954) was the seventh Commandant of the United States Coast Guard, from 1932 to 1936.

Early life and career
Hamlet was born in Eastport, Maine, and was the son of Captain Oscar G. Hamlet, an officer in the United States Revenue Cutter Service. Upon graduation from high school in the Dorchester neighborhood of Boston, Massachusetts, he attended the Massachusetts Institute of Technology. He was appointed as one of twelve cadets to the recently reopened Revenue Cutter Service School of Instruction on 12 April 1894 and received training aboard USRC Chase, the school's newly refitted training cutter. After completion of training, Hamlet was commissioned as a third lieutenant on 27 April 1896 and was assigned to USRC Bear and served aboard her during the Overland Relief Expedition which involved the rescue of whalers trapped in Arctic ice near Point Barrow, Alaska.
Hamlet was promoted to second lieutenant on 11 August 1897. 

Hamlet reported aboard the newly reacquired USRC Thetis at Mare Island Navy Yard in 1899. After a refit, Thetis was assigned duty in Siberia to purchase reindeer for transport to Alaska. The reindeer were to be used to start herds in Alaska which were to eventually be used to supplement winter food supplies for Alaska natives. Hamlet was especially skilled at bartering with the Siberian natives and was put in charge of all negotiations for the cruise. He was later singled out by the captain of the Thetis for his skill in barter in dispatches to headquarters.

In 1900, Hamlet became one of the first Revenue Cutter Service officers to attend the Naval War College in Newport, Rhode Island. Upon completion of his studies, he returned to duty aboard the Bear, serving on patrol duty with the Bering Sea Patrol. On 28 March 1905 Hamlet was promoted to first lieutenant. On 19 July 1913 Hamlet was promoted to captain.  On 25 November 1913 he assumed his first command as a captain as the commanding officer of USRC Unalga, home-ported at Seattle, Washington. Hamlet was transferred to the United States Coast Guard Depot at Curtis Bay, Maryland on 15 November 1915.

World War I and postwar assignments
On 18 September 1917 Hamlet was assigned to the Third Naval District at Bensonhurst, New York. This rescue was made extremely difficult and hazardous owing to high seas, which threatened to send the two vessels crashing together. In effecting the rescue, Hamlet displayed admirable seamanship and on 5 January 1920 he was awarded the Gold Lifesaving Medal. From 1919 to 1922, he served as the Coast Guard's Chief Personnel Officer. From 1924 to 1928, he served as Superintendent of the Philadelphia Navy Yard. From 1928 until his appointment as commandant, he served as superintendent of the United States Coast Guard Academy at New London, Connecticut.

Commandant
Following the death of Frederick C. Billard, he was appointed as Commandant of the Coast Guard by President Herbert Hoover on 14 June 1932. As Commandant during the Great Depression, he struggled with low budgets and limited appropriations. In response, Hamlet implemented a cost-cutting plan which called for decommissioning of vessels, closing of Coast Guard stations, manpower reductions, and a 25% reduction in expenditures. These measures led to calls to merge the Coast Guard with the United States Navy. With the support of Chief of Naval Operations, Admiral William V. Pratt, however, Hamlet succeeded in persuading President Franklin D. Roosevelt and Congress from taking such action.

Later career
Upon completion of his term, he was succeeded as commandant by Russell R. Waesche, and reverted in rank to captain on 1 January 1936. He was retained on special duty in the office of Secretary of the Treasury Henry Morgenthau Jr. He also served as Chairman of the Personnel Advisory Committee to the U.S. Senate Commerce Committee, which was responsible for studying maritime issues and recommending legislation on improving the United States Merchant Marine.

The Creed of the United States Coast Guardsman

The following creed was authored by Admiral Hamlet in 1938:

Retirement
Hamlet retired from the U.S. Coast Guard on 1 September 1938, just after his 64th birthday. By virtue of his service as commandant, his retired rank would have been rear admiral; he was, however, promoted to vice admiral in recognition of his four decades of service. After his death at the age of 79, he was interred at Arlington National Cemetery.

Awards
 Gold Lifesaving Medal
 World War I Victory Medal with clasp

Notes
Footnotes

Citations

References cited

External links

 

1874 births
1954 deaths
American military personnel of World War I
Burials at Arlington National Cemetery
Commandants of the United States Coast Guard
Massachusetts Institute of Technology alumni
Naval War College alumni
People from Eastport, Maine
People from Dorchester, Massachusetts
Military personnel from Maine
Military personnel from Massachusetts
Recipients of the Gold Lifesaving Medal
United States Revenue Cutter Service officers